Toša Đorđević (c. 1790-1850) was a Serbian military official, known for his bravery in the First Serbian Uprising. He was the right-hand-man of Hadži-Veljko during the liberation of the Gurgusovačkog kraja, today's Knjaževac district. After the liberation, Toša was elevated to the rank of voivode of the district.
Years later, Toša Djordjević fell in disfavour when the Miloš government removed him as the Captain of Zaglavlje after the suppression of a rebellion in a Bulgarian town of Belogradchik in 1836. Miloš did this as a diplomatic move to appease the Porte and remove all existing rumours of troubles brewing at the borders of Serbia and Bulgaria.

Toša Djordjević died in 1850 in Knjaževac.

References 

1790s births
1850 deaths
People from Knjaževac
First Serbian Uprising
1790 births